Cyperus castaneobellus is a species of sedge that is endemic to an area in southern Tanzania.

The species was first formally described by the botanist Kåre Arnstein Lye in 1983.

See also
 List of Cyperus species

References

castaneobellus
Flora of Tanzania
Plants described in 1983
Taxa named by Kåre Arnstein Lye